Kosmogonia is a composition by Krzysztof Penderecki.

Kosmogonia (derived from cosmos) was commissioned by and in celebration of the United Nations twenty-fifth anniversary. It was then performed (on October 24, 1970) at the United Nations Headquarters in New York with Zubin Mehta, the choir of Rutgers University and the Los Angeles Philharmonic Orchestra. Penderecki composed the work in his then avant-garde style. The work is written for an extensive line-up, both in choir and in orchestra:
 soloists: soprano, tenor and bass
 mixed choir: sopranos, alten, tenors, baritones
 4 flutes, of which 2 also piccolo, 4 oboes, 3 clarinets, 1 bass clarinets, 3 bassoons, 1 contra bassoon, 2 alto saxophones, 1 baritone saxophone
 6 horns, 4 trumpets, 4 trombones, 2 tubas
 4 male / female percussion, bass guitar, harp, celesta, harmonium, piano, organ
 24 violins, 10 violas, 10 cellos and 8 double bass

The work was put on LP soon after the premiere by the Polish National Radio Symphony Orchestra with choir conducted by Andrzej Markowski. The next recording of this piece was released in a continuous retrospective by the composer in 2012.

References

Polish music
Compositions by Krzysztof Penderecki
Compositions that use extended techniques
Contemporary classical compositions